Senecio flaccidus, formerly recorded as Senecio douglasii (in honor of the botanist David Douglas), member of the daisy family and genus Senecio  also known as threadleaf ragwort (and threadleaf groundsel, bush senecio, creek senecio, shrubby butterweed, comb butterweed, smooth threadleaf ragwort, Mono ragwort, Douglas ragwort, Douglas groundsel, sand wash groundsel, felty groundsel, old man, yerba cana, squawweed or cenicillo), is a native of the southwestern Great Plains of North America.

Description

The principal leaves often have auxiliary clusters of smaller leaves. The stems are grooved and the branches are thin, herbaceous above and woody near the base.

Seeds  Dicotyledon fruits; each a 1/8 inch (3 mm) long achene ribbed and hoary, covered with short white hairs.

Toxicity
Colonizing disturbed areas including over-grazed lands, Senecio flaccidus helps to achieve a quick ground cover and helps to stabilize the soil for longer-lived perennials but in this situation makes poor foraging for cattle and horses due to the alkaloids contained in the plant which cause liver disease when consumed in large quantities.

Also known as Senecio longilobus, one of the alkaloids found in this species is longilobine, as well as senecionine, seneciphylline, florosenine, otonecine-based florosenine, and retrorsine.

Distribution
Like many Senecio Senecio flaccidus likes disturbed habitats, this one preferring overgrazed rangelands, dried up stream beds and desert grasslands; at altitudes above  and below .

Native 
America
North-Central: Kansas, Oklahoma
Northwestern: Colorado
South-Central: New Mexico, Texas
Southwestern: Arizona, Utah
Northern Mexico: Chihuahua, Coahuila, Durango, San Luis Potosí, Sonora, Zacatecas
Central Mexico: Aguascalientes, Guanajuato, Hidalgo, Jalisco (n.e.), Veracruz

Current 
America
North-Central: Kansas, Oklahoma, Wyoming
Northwestern: Colorado
South-Central: New Mexico, Texas
Southwestern: Arizona, California, Nevada, Utah
Northern Mexico: Chihuahua, Coahuila, Durango, San Luis Potosí, Sonora, Zacatecas, Baja California
Central Mexico: Aguascalientes, Baja Norte, Guanajuato, Hidalgo, Jalisco (n.e.), Veracruz

Subspecies which are synonyms
Senecio flaccidus Less. var. flaccidus
Senecio douglasii DC. var. longilobus (Benth.) L.D. Benson
Senecio douglasii DC. var. jamesii (Torr. & A. Gray) Ediger ex Correll & M.C. Johnst.
Senecio douglasii DC. ssp. longilobus (Benth.) W.A. Weber
Senecio flaccidus Less. var. monoensis (Greene) B. L. Turner & T. M. Barkley
Senecio flaccidus Less. var. douglasii  (DC.) B. L. Turner & T. M. Barkley
Senecio flaccidus var. flaccidus

See also
Pyrrolizidine

References

External links

flaccidus
Flora of Central Mexico
Flora of Northeastern Mexico
Flora of Northwestern Mexico
Flora of New Mexico
Flora of Texas
Flora of the United States
Flora of North America